is a Japanese folk singer and songwriter who was born in Urayasu, Chiba and raised in Kyoto Prefecture, Japan.  She releases music on her own label, hermine. Her main instrument is guitar, which most of her music is mainly composed of, but she also plays the piano, clarinet, accordion, and flute on her own. Aoba is known for her acoustic sound and songwriting, which is inspired by her dreams.

Early life 
Ichiko Aoba began to learn how to play classical guitar at the age of 17, and her music has been inspired by Disney music and Studio Ghibli, both of which she listened to growing up. Her mentor was Japanese singer-songwriter Anmi Yamada, who remotely taught Aoba the craft of the instrument. Aoba's albums 0 and qp each feature two covers of Anmi's songs.

Career 
Aoba released her first album, Razor Girl (Japanese: 剃刀乙女), at the age of 19 in 2010. Since then, she has released 6 albums, as well as a few live albums.

Around 2012, Aoba was introduced to Gezan frontman Mahi to the People by their mutual friend Koji Shimotsu (frontman of Odotte Bakari no Kuni). Aoba and Mahito formed the collaborative duo Nuuamm, which has since released two studio albums: Nuuamm (2014) and w/ave (2017).

In 2013, Aoba was asked to work for a theatre production of "9 Days Queen", a stage play by playwright Go Aoki. She has also worked with Takahiro Fujita's Mum & Gypsy company in a production of "Cocoon", as well as a revival of "Lemming" by Shūji Terayama.

Aoba was also featured in the soundtrack of the 2019 Nintendo Switch remake of The Legend of Zelda: Link's Awakening, and her arrangement was used to promote the game in Japan.

Discography

Studio albums
 2010: Kamisori Otome (剃刀乙女)
 2011: Origami (檻髪)
 2012: Utabiko (うたびこ)
 2013: 0
 2016: Mahoroboshiya (マホロボシヤ)
 2018: qp
 2020: Windswept Adan (アダンの風)
 2022: Amiko

Live albums 
 2011: Kaizokuban (かいぞくばん)
 2014: 0%
 2017: Pneuma
 2020:  "gift" at Sogetsu Hall
 2021:  "Windswept Adan" Concert At Bunkamura Orchard Hall

Other releases 
 2011: Hinoko (火のこ) – Ichiko Aoba & Kazuhisa Uchihashi
 2012: Meteor (流星) – Haruka Nakamura & Ichiko Aoba 
 2013: Radio (ラヂヲ) – Ichiko Aoba and the Fairies (青葉市子と妖精たち)
 2013: Yura Yura feat. Ichiko Aoba – Ovall (Dawn)
 2013: Soto wa Senjou da yo (外は戦場だよ) feat. Ichiko Aoba – Cornelius (Ghost in the Shell: Arise OST)
 2020: amuletum bouquet – Ichiko Aoba
 2020: "gift" BGM – Ichiko Aoba
 2020: Seabed Eden – Ichiko Aoba
 2021: Asleep Among Endives – Ichiko Aoba
 2021: Windswept Adan Roots – Ichiko Aoba

References

External links 
 Official website

1990 births
Living people
Japanese women singer-songwriters
Japanese singer-songwriters
Singers from Tokyo
21st-century Japanese singers
21st-century Japanese women singers